The Sybarite is a 16-inch resin or vinyl artist-doll designed by London artists Desmond Lingard and Charles Fegen in 2005. These dolls are largely produced in China, with occasional One of a Kind dolls made in London.  Sybarite dolls are fully articulated mannequin-like dolls and have appeared in several fashion trades (French Revue des Modes, Style.com, Women's Wear Daily). HauteDoll features Sybarites on the Covers of their magazines.

The designers work under the "Superdoll" moniker and produce the dolls for a collector market. Previous to artist dolls, Fegen worked in the fashion industry as a clothing designer.

Early dolls were handmade in London by Lingard and Fegen in their workshop. As the dolls went into the mainstream market, manufacturing moved to China.

The dolls have 17 points of articulation, and have strung bodies similar to the Super Dollfie dolls from Japan. The Sybarite doll was introduced shortly after Asian ball-jointed dolls were gaining popularity, but differ in that they are high fashion mannequins versus the Asian ball-jointed dolls' anime inspired childlike quality. 

In 2007, a Sybarite doll appeared in the audience at a Dior Couture fashion show. A seat had been reserved for the doll to sit in. Lingard and Fegen are known for their lavish publicity stunts. The dolls were also exhibited at Jeffrey New York in an "all white collection", including a "razor blade dress", suggesting a very controversial cocaine theme.

In March 2008, the BBC aired a segment on Fegen and Lingard claiming the duo's handmade creations are treated with "the reverence normally reserved for catwalk fashion". In the video BBC's David Harper accompanied Fegen and Lingard to Paris where the 2008 Collection, entitled "War+Peace", was shown at a private 16th century residence. In the Youtube video clip taken from the original program Fegen explains The Sybarites live in a apocalyptic world, but still enjoy luxuries. The dolls can be custom ordered but price is not allowed to be discussed, as money is a vulgar subject. Some of Fegen's inspirations behind his collections are red and white polka dot shoes representing "magic mushrooms for breakfast", and showed costumes featuring tiny bullets which were actually miniature lipsticks. At the end of the BBC segment, David Harper stated that one of a kind handmade studio Sybarites have been purchased for up to $20,000 to $40,000 USD. Sybarites Owners were interviewed but would not discuss pricing. At the Paris showing, the purchase of a two doll set required a signed contract stipulating owners could not discuss pricing or sell their dolls for 3 years. 

In 2015, the 10th Anniversary of the Sybarites debut, Superdoll unveiled their new GEN_X collection and successfully made the transition from Resin to Vinyl production dolls.  This new Generation of Sybarites has a body (GEN_X) and Venus d'Royce head sculpt (Clone 1000) made entirely out of a semi-solid vinyl.  They are still strung together with elastic cord, but they feature new technology and jointing.

In Oct 2016, Superdoll re-introduced their resin Sybarite doll at their Glamour Ghoul London convention.  This new resin Sybarite has an updated body (GEN_4.5) and Venus d'Royce head sculpt (Clone 800).  The new resin dolls will be produced alongside the vinyl dolls.

References

External links
 Superdoll Collectibles Official site
 BBC London: Inside Out Feature on Sybarites (March 28, 2008)

Fashion dolls